Juchilestes is an amphidontid mammal genus from the early Cretaceous (early Aptian stage, 123.2 ± 1.0 Ma). It lived in what is now the Beipiao of western Liaoning, eastern China. It is known from the holotype D2607, which consists of three-dimensionally preserved, partial skull with mandibles and some teeth. It was found in 2004 from the Lujiatun Site of the Yixian Formation (Jehol Biota). It was first named by Chun-Ling Gao, Gregory P. Wilson, Zhe-Xi Luo, A. Murat Maga, Qingjin Meng and Xuri Wang in 2010 and the type species is Juchilestes liaoningensis.

Phylogeny 
Cladogram after Thomas Martin et al. 2015

References

Eutriconodonts
Fossil taxa described in 2010
Early Cretaceous mammals of Asia
Taxa named by Chun-Ling Gao
Taxa named by Gregory P. Wilson
Taxa named by Zhe-Xi Luo
Taxa named by A. Murat Maga
Taxa named by Qing-Jin Meng
Taxa named by Xuri Wang
Prehistoric mammal genera